I Don't Know What the World Is Coming To is the seventh studio album by American singer-songwriter Bobby Womack. The album was released on March 28, 1975, by United Artists Records. The album debuted at number 126 on the Billboard 200.

In 1978 British rock singer Rod Stewart lifted the melody from "(If You Want My Love) Put Something Down On It" for his hit song "Da Ya Think I'm Sexy?"

Track listing

Personnel
Bobby Womack - guitar, bass, vocals
Glen Goins, Charles Fullilove, Ken Khristian, Larry Otis - guitar
Sneaky Pete Kleinow - pedal steel
Tommy Cogbill, Paul Stallworth, Chuck Rainey - bass
Truman Thomas, Roger Dollarhide, David Foster, Bobby Wood, William Smith, Leon Ware - keyboards
Robert Robertie, Ron Selico, Jim Keltner, Bill Braun, Bill Lordan, Larry Zack, Soko Richardson - drums
Joe Lala - congas
Jonathan Blair - electric violin
Cosme DeAguero - vibraphone
Catherine Gotthoffer - harp
René Hall - strings
Bill Withers - vocals on "It's All Over Now"
Cindy "Sundray" Scott - answer vocals on "What's Your World"
Linda Lawrence - answer vocals on "Interlude #2"
Technical
Truman Thomas - associate producer
Roger Dollarhide - engineer
Bob Cato, Lloyd Ziff - art direction
Ria Lewerke - design
Doug Metzler - photography

References

1975 albums
Bobby Womack albums
Albums arranged by René Hall
Albums produced by Bobby Womack
United Artists Records albums